Matthew B. J. Delaney (also known as; Matthew B Delaney) is an American writer and member of the New York City Police Department.  Originally from Sudbury, Massachusetts, Delaney now resides in New York City.

Delaney is an alumnus of Dartmouth College in New Hampshire. His debut novel Jinn won the International Horror Guild Award in 2004 and was well received by both critics and readers.  The film rights for his first book were sold to Touchstone Pictures, before Delaney even finished writing it.

The rights to his forthcoming second novel, Genome, Inc., was purchased in German by Bastei Lübbe in November 2009 and published as Golem in Germany in 2012.

Delaney is a decorated member of the NYPD, but continues to write in his spare time.

Works
 Jinn. New York: St. Martin's Press, in 2003, 
 Golem. Köln: Bastei Lübbe in 2012, 
 Black Rain. 47North, in 2016, 
 The Memory Agent. 47North, in 2017,

References 

http://www.metrowestdailynews.com/news/x1166552836/Spitz-An-officer-gentleman-and-author

External links

Macmillan author page
Macmillan Jinn page

American horror writers
21st-century American novelists
Living people
Dartmouth College alumni
Novelists from Massachusetts
American crime fiction writers
American thriller writers
American male novelists
New York City Police Department officers
Writers from New York City
21st-century American male writers
Novelists from New York (state)
Year of birth missing (living people)
Harvard Kennedy School alumni
People from Sudbury, Massachusetts